Ernst Wolrad, Prince of Schaumburg-Lippe (19 April 1887 – 15 June 1962) was head of the Princely House of Schaumburg-Lippe.

Biography
He was born at Stadthagen, the fourth son of Georg, Prince of Schaumburg-Lippe and his wife, Princess Marie Anne of Saxe-Altenburg (1864–1918). He succeeded his brother Prince Adolf II as head of the Princely House following his death in a plane crash in Mexico on 26 March 1936. Following his death at Hanover, he was succeeded as head of the Princely House by his second son, Philipp-Ernst.

Marriage and children

He was married at Simbach am Inn in April 1925 to his second cousin, Princess Bathildis of Schaumburg-Lippe (1903–1983), only daughter of Prince Albert of Schaumburg-Lippe and Duchess Elsa of Württemberg.
They had four children:
Adolf Friedrich Georg-Wilhelm Wolrad Hans-Werner, Hereditary Prince of Schaumburg-Lippe (1926–1945)
Friedrich August Philipp-Ernst Wolrad, Prince of Schaumburg-Lippe (1928–2003)
Prince Konstantin Karl-Eduard Ernst-August Stephan Alexander of Schaumburg-Lippe (1930-2008)
Princess Elsa Viktoria Luise Marie Barbara Elisabeth Bathildis Wera of Schaumburg-Lippe (1940)

Ancestry

References 

 

1887 births
1962 deaths
People from Stadthagen
House of Lippe
Pretenders to the throne of Schaumburg-Lippe
Sons of monarchs
Non-inheriting heirs presumptive